Paul Coleman (born 1968) is an Irish retired Gaelic footballer. His league and championship career with the Cork senior team lasted from 1991 until 1995.

Coleman made his debut on the inter-county scene at the age of seventeen when he was selected for the Cork minor team. He had one championship season with the minor team, and was an All-Ireland runner-up. Coleman subsequently joined the Cork under-21 and junior teams, winning an All-Ireland medal with the juniors in 1990. He joined the Cork senior team during the 1991 championship. An All-Ireland runner-up in 1993, Coleman he won three Munster medals.

Honours

Cork
 Munster Senior Football Championship (3): 1993, 1994, 1995
 All-Ireland Junior Football Championship (1): 1990
 Munster Junior Football Championship (2): 1990, 1992
 Munster Minor Football Championship (1): 1986

References

1968 births
Living people
Grenagh Gaelic footballers
Grenagh hurlers
Cork inter-county Gaelic footballers